Godair Township is an inactive township in Pemiscot County, in the U.S. state of Missouri.

Godair Township has the name of the local Godair family.

References

Townships in Missouri
Townships in Pemiscot County, Missouri